Following are the results of the 1940 Soviet Top League football championship.

Standings

Results

Top scorers
21 goals
 Grigory Fedotov (CDKA Moscow)
 Sergei Solovyov (Dynamo Moscow)

15 goals
 Nikolay Dementyev (Dynamo Moscow)

14 goals
 Aleksandr Ponomarev (Traktor Stalingrad)

13 goals
 Gaioz Jejelava (Dinamo Tbilisi)
 Pavel Kornilov (Spartak Moscow)
 Viktor Semyonov (Spartak Moscow)
 Mikhail Semichastny (Dynamo Moscow)

12 goals
 Boris Paichadze (Dinamo Tbilisi)

11 goals
 Viktor Berezhnoy (Dinamo Tbilisi)

References

 Soviet Union - List of final tables (RSSSF)

Soviet Top League seasons
1
Soviet
Soviet